Norm Houser (1915–1996) was an American racecar driver.

Indy 500 results

References

American racing drivers
Indianapolis 500 drivers
1915 births
1996 deaths
Racing drivers from Indiana
Racing drivers from Indianapolis
Sportspeople from Indianapolis